Abdulla Edriss Ebrahim (died 2 August 2004) was a member of the Pan-African Parliament from Libya.

References 

Year of birth missing
2004 deaths
Members of the Pan-African Parliament from Libya